Hoogstede is a community in the district of Grafschaft Bentheim in Lower Saxony.

Geography

Location
Hoogstede lies northwest of Nordhorn on the German-Dutch border. The Vechte flows through town, and its tributary, the Lee empties into it here. The community belongs to the Joint Community (Samtgemeinde) of Emlichheim, whose administrative seat is in the like-named community.

Constituent communities
The community’s seven centres are Hoogstede, Kalle, Tinholt, Arkel, Bathorn, Scheerhorn and Berge.

History
Hoogstede’s history begins in 1821 when the Evangelical-Reformed parish’s chapel was moved from Arkel to Hoogstede. In 1859, the Catholic church was built, and by and by a population centre developed. In 1953, the Evangelical-Old Reformed church was built, and in 1961 the Lutheran church.

Today, roughly 2,900 people live in Hoogstede and its outlying centres.

Religion
Hoogstede is home to four churches:
 Evangelical-Reformed
 Evangelical-Old Reformed
 Evangelical-Lutheran
 Catholic

Politics

Municipal council
Hoogstede’s council is made up of 13 councillors.
CDU 10 seats
SPD 2 seats
FDP 1 seat
(as of municipal election on 10 September 2006)

Mayor
The honorary mayor Jan Ensink was elected on 14 November 2006 at the municipal council’s constitutive meeting.

Clubs and associations
Various clubs and associations have established themselves:
 Hoogsteder Sportverein (sport club)
 Landjugend Hoogstede (“rural youth”)
 Ortsfeuerwehr Hoogstede (fire brigade)
 DRK-Ortsverein Hoogstede (German Red Cross)
 Grafschafter Autocross Club GACC
 Heimatverein Hoogstede-Arkel (“homeland club”)
 Schützenverein Hoogstede (shooting club)
 Schützenverein Niedergrafschafter Edelweiß-Schützen Bathorn (shooting club)

References

External links
Hoogstede’s website
Joint community’s webpage

County of Bentheim (district)